Hector McLeod Sam (born 25 February 1978) is a Trinidadian former international footballer striker.

He spent eight years as a professional player in the English Football League, most significantly playing a total of 176 games for Welsh club Wrexham between 2000 and 2005, helping them to league and cup success. After spending a season on the sidelines at Port Vale following a broken leg, he signed with Walsall in 2006. Following the club's relegation he switched to Notts County, before leaving the professional game in 2008. Either side of his adventures in the UK he played for hometown club San Juan Jabloteh.

In a six-year international career he scored two goals in twenty appearances, helping his country to qualify for the 2006 FIFA World Cup.

Club career
Growing up with Marvin Andrews in San Juan, Sam attended Queen's Royal College in Trinidad for a short stint, before beginning his career at Port of Spain based San Juan Jabloteh. He moved to the United Kingdom to play for Welsh club Wrexham in the summer of 2000. There he teamed up with fellow Trini internationals Carlos Edwards and later Dennis Lawrence.

He made his Football League debut on 12 August 2000, playing a Second Division game at the Racecourse Ground against Bristol City, which finished in a 2–0 win for the visitors. Seven days later he scored his first goal for the club in a visit to Gigg Lane; Sam scored the second goal of a 4–1 hammering of Bury. He then went on to strike five times in his next five games, putting one past Wigan Athletic, Rotherham United and Colchester United, as well as a brace past Oldham Athletic. However, he failed to score in the rest of his sixteen games that season. The young international made 33 appearances in 2001–02. He scored five league goals, one each away at Wigan, Peterborough United, Cardiff City, as well as a brace upon his return to Gigg Lane. His exploits were not enough to save the club from relegation to the Third Division.

Wrexham went straight back up in 2002–03, Sam making 32 appearances and scoring another five goals. His goals came against Oxford United, Macclesfield Town, Swansea City, Hartlepool United and Carlisle United. He was transfer listed by manager Denis Smith in May 2003, despite penning a two-year deal two months previous. The 2003–04 season was one of Sam's strongest. He scored twelve times in 41 games, managing to score twice in one game on two occasions – against Blackpool and Luton Town. In January 2004 Rotherham United manager Ronnie Moore expressed an interest in signing him, though nothing came of it. In 2004–05 he again scored twelve times, though this was not enough to save Wrexham from the drop – thanks to them being deducted ten points for entering administration. His first competitive hat-trick in the English game came on 10 August at Boundary Park, as he scored all of Wrexham's goals in a 3–2 win over Oldham. He also picked up his first sending off, seeing red against Huddersfield Town on 27 November at the Galpharm Stadium, he received the red just three minutes after replacing Juan Ugarte (the sending over was later overturned upon appeal). In March 2005, he scored his seventh career goal against Oldham, though accepted he was now a 'super-sub' at Wrexham. His twelve goals earned the club eleven points, they would have been saved if it were not for administration. He was an unused substitute in the club's 2005 Football League Trophy success. At the end of the season he signed for Port Vale, who themselves had narrowly avoided relegation.

After three appearances in August 2005 he broke his leg, and had to wait until April 2006 to take to the field again. The injury limited him to just five appearances in 2005–06, and at the end of the campaign he dropped down to League Two to sign with Vale's West Midlands rivals Walsall. He made scored seven goals in a massive 47 appearances in 2006–07, as the club went up as champions. Despite this he was let go at the end of the season. He was subsequently signed by Notts County in May 2007. County had a disappointing 2007–08, finishing just six points off relegated Mansfield Town – and eight points ahead of his old club Wrexham. He made 24 appearances before being dropped in January, scoring just two goals; one against Hereford United and the other against Histon in the FA Cup. He left the club by mutual agreement in March 2008.

Returning to his homeland, in January 2009 he re-joined old club San Juan Jabloteh, signing in time for the start of the 2009 season. Jabloteh finished the campaign as runners-up to Joe Public. This was followed by a disappointing sixth-place finish in 2010–11. He later joined St. Ann's Rangers and then Central, who finished fifth in 2012–13 and 2013–14 under the management of Terry Fenwick. He later played for Police FC and Saddle Hill Hotspur.

International career
Sam was named as a backup player for the Trinidad and Tobago national team in the 2006 World Cup. He might have made the final cut if he was not recovering from a broken leg. He made his debut for the "Soca Warriors" in 1999 and earned a total of twenty caps in a six-year stint, scoring two goals.

International goals
Scores and results list Trinidad and Tobago's goal tally first.

Career statistics

Club statistics

International statistics

Honours
San Juan Jabloteh
Trinidad and Tobago Cup winner: 1998 & 2011
Trinidad and Tobago League Cup winner: 1999

Wrexham
FAW Premier Cup winner: 2001, 2003 & 2004; runner-up: 2005
Football League Third Division third-place promotion winner: 2002–03
Football League Trophy: 2005

Walsall
League Two: 2006–07

References

External links

1978 births
Living people
Trinidad and Tobago footballers
Trinidad and Tobago international footballers
Trinidad and Tobago expatriate footballers
Expatriate footballers in England
Association football forwards
Wrexham A.F.C. players
Port Vale F.C. players
Walsall F.C. players
Notts County F.C. players
San Juan Jabloteh F.C. players
St. Ann's Rangers F.C. players
Central F.C. players
TT Pro League players
English Football League players
Alumni of Queen's Royal College, Trinidad